Northwest Harwich is a census-designated place (CDP) in the town of Harwich in Barnstable County, Massachusetts, United States. The population was 3,929 at the 2010 census. The CDP includes the Harwich villages of West Harwich, North Harwich, and Pleasant Lake, as well as a portion of the mailing area for Harwich Port.

Geography
The Northwest Harwich CDP occupies the entire western side of the town of Harwich. Neighboring CDPs within Harwich, from north to south, are East Harwich, Harwich Center, and Harwich Port. Nantucket Sound is to the south, and the towns of Dennis and Brewster are to the west and north, respectively.

Demographics

As of the census of 2000, there were 4,001 people, 1,608 households, and 1,093 families residing in the CDP. The population density was 190.2/km (492.9/mi). There were 3,126 housing units at an average density of 148.6/km (385.1/mi). The racial makeup of the CDP was 94.13% White, 1.15% African American, 0.22% Native American, 0.07% Asian, 0.10% Pacific Islander, 2.87% from other races, and 1.45% from two or more races. Hispanic or Latino of any race were 1.27% of the population.

There were 1,608 households, out of which 25.0% had children under the age of 18 living with them, 54.9% were married couples living together, 10.1% had a female householder with no husband present, and 32.0% were non-families. 26.4% of all households were made up of individuals, and 13.8% had someone living alone who was 65 years of age or older. The average household size was 2.32 and the average family size was 2.80.

In the CDP, the population was spread out, with 19.5% under the age of 18, 4.6% from 18 to 24, 22.6% from 25 to 44, 24.1% from 45 to 64, and 29.1% who were 65 years of age or older. The median age was 47 years. For every 100 females, there were 81.3 males. For every 100 females age 18 and over, there were 76.2 males.

The median income for a household in the CDP was $41,250, and the median income for a family was $53,533. Males had a median income of $41,170 versus $29,321 for females. The per capita income for the CDP was $22,602. About 1.5% of families and 3.9% of the population were below the poverty line, including 1.8% of those under age 18 and 7.7% of those age 65 or over.

West Harwich

The principal populated center in the CDP is the village of West Harwich. West Harwich is located along Massachusetts Route 28 and has many stores, shops, homes, neighborhoods, apartments and vacation homes. West Harwich is home to the Holy Trinity School, which serves grades 5–8. Children in West Harwich may also attend the Harwich Elementary School located in Harwich Center. During the summer, West Harwich is among the most densely populated areas of Harwich and Dennis.

North Harwich and Pleasant Lake

North Harwich and Pleasant Lake are less densely populated than West Harwich. North Harwich has been seeing some commercial activities in the past ten to fifteen years and has seen many new homes built. Pleasant Lake has remained as it always was, one of the least known Harwich villages.

References

Harwich, Massachusetts
Census-designated places in Barnstable County, Massachusetts
Census-designated places in Massachusetts
Populated coastal places in Massachusetts